Golds is an English surname.  Notable people with the surname include:
 Cassandra Golds (born 1962), Australian writer
 Shannon Golds (born 1986), Australian tennis player
 Tim Golds (born 1993), Australian rules footballer

English-language surnames